Inferential Theory of Learning (ITL) is an area of machine learning which describes inferential processes performed by learning agents. ITL has been continuously developed by Ryszard S. Michalski, starting in the 1980s. The first known publication of ITL was in 1983. In ITL learning process is viewed as a search (inference) through hypotheses space guided by a specific goal. Results of learning need to be stored. Stored information will later be used by the learner for future inferences. Inferences are split into multiple categories including conclusive, deduction, and induction. In order for an inference to be considered complete it was required that all categories must be taken into account. This is how the ITL varies from other machine learning theories like Computational Learning Theory and Statistical Learning Theory; which both use singular forms of inference.

Usage

The most relevant published usage of ITL was in scientific journal published in 2012 and used ITL as a way to describe how agent-based learning works. According to the journal "The Inferential Theory of Learning (ITL) provides an elegant way of describing learning processes by agents".

References

Further reading

 Ryszard S. Michalski, Jaime G. Carbonell, Tom M. Mitchell (1983), Machine Learning: An Artificial Intelligence Approach, Tioga Publishing Company, .
 Ryszard S. Michalski, Jaime G. Carbonell, Tom M. Mitchell (1986), Machine Learning: An Artificial Intelligence Approach, Volume II, Morgan Kaufmann, .
 Yves Kodratoff, Ryszard S. Michalski (1990), Machine Learning: An Artificial Intelligence Approach, Volume III, Morgan Kaufmann, .
 Ryszard S. Michalski, George Tecuci (1994), Machine Learning: A Multistrategy Approach, Volume IV, Morgan Kaufmann, .
 Naidenova, X. (Ed.),(2009), Machine Learning Methods for Commonsense Reasoning Processes: Interactive Models: Interactive Models, IGI Global,.

Cybernetics
Learning
Machine learning